Locust Point may refer to a location in the United States:

Locust Point, Baltimore, Maryland, a neighborhood
Locust Point, Bronx, New York, a neighborhood
Locust, New Jersey, originally named Locust Point, an unincorporated area